Bigfoot: Collision Course is a 2008 monster truck racing game featuring the Bigfoot, widely regarded as the first monster truck.

The game features three vehicle categories: light (amateur) monster trucks, pro stock monster trucks and pro modified monster trucks, with differing course configurations for each vehicle class.

References

2008 video games
Windows games
Nintendo DS games
Wii games
Monster truck video games
Video games developed in the United States